Zachem snyatsya sny is the 23rd and final album by the Russian garage band Grazhdanskaya Oborona. It was released on 9 May 2007.

History 
The album is inspired by a bad LSD trip taken by Letov. The album was influenced by Egor i Opizdenevshie, whose name appears on the album. In an interview shortly after the release, he stated he had used up all his creative energies and that there would be no more GrOb albums - a statement which would turn out to be true when Letov died.

The song "Nochyu" was originally titled "Pryg-skok II". It was written during the aforementioned LSD trip and included many fragments of Letov's poetry from 1992 to 1994 in the lyrics. The original song was much longer than the final cut. The album was originally issued on CD. The Russian release came in a digipack with a booklet containing full lyrics, while the Ukrainian one came in a standard jewel case with only a four-page booklet containing a picture of the band. The album was reissued in 2012 on vinyl with new dynamic mastering compared to the loud one of the CD.

The title comes from a song written by Robert Rozhdestvensky. The song doesn't appear on this album, however it was recorded in 1993 by Egor i Opizdenevshie and in 2000 by Natalia Chumakova.

The album artwork is a famous painting of Noah's Ark by Edward Hicks. The painting was previously used on Bijelo Dugme's Ćiribiribela (1989).

Track list

References

External links 
 Zachem snyatsya sny? at Discogs (list of versions)

2007 albums
Grazhdanskaya Oborona albums